The 3 Skypephone S2 is a UMTS, GSM and VoIP mobile phone. The phone is the successor to 3 Skypephone and the second phone from the 3 Skypephone Series.

iSkoot 

The 3 Skypephone S2 runs on the iSkoot for Skype platform to provide its Skype service. iSkoot's shutdown of this service on 20 January 2011 caused this phone to show a non-functioning "click to upgrade" link, although some other phones were not affected. No warning was given by Three for this shutdown, and visiting the Three website shows they removed the Skypephone from their product offerings. This violates Three's own terms and conditions and the "Free Skype forever" promise leaving customers very angry and unable to use the arguably main functionality of this phone.

In the box 

 Handset
 Battery 1150 mAh. (AH-02)
 Battery cover.
 Personal stereo hands free kit (via mini-USB connector).
 USB cable.
 Mains charger (USB connector).
 3 user guide.
 Quick start guide for Skype.
 Additional guides

Specifications

The specifications released are as follow:

 Dimensions: 102.7 x 45 x 14mm
 Weight: 95g
 Display: 2.2in QVGA
 Battery: 1150mAh
 CPU: ARM variant as runs BREW operating system (see ARM architecture)
 Memory: 50Mb onboard
 External memory: Micro SD up to 4Gb
 Camera: 3.2Mpx camera
 HSDPA support: Up to 2.6Mbit/s
 Additional features:
 HSDPA modem dongle
 Facebook application
Many native Brew applications.
 RSS reader
 Stereo handsfree and USB cable included

The battery life is as follows:

 Standby 320 hours
 Talk Time 270 minutes
 Video Talk Time 170 minutes

Supported functionality
 Bluetooth stack with OBEX file transfer and A2DP support
 Streaming video (can receive TV channels, watch movies or YouTube over the 3G network)
 Streaming audio
 Free Skype-to-skype calls
 E-mail
 T9 dictionary
 3.2Mpx camera
 Video recording
 Audio recording
 MP3 player (can also play WMA and AAC files)
 Memory: 50Mb onboard
 External memory: Micro SD up to 4Gb
 PC Suite synchronization (With Vista support)
 HSDPA support: Up to 2.6Mbit/s
 HSDPA modem dongle
 Podcasting with Mobilcast (unofficially supported)
 Supports Java ME applications such as Opera Mini and many Java ME games.
 Facebook always on application, change your status and easily access your profile, friends, inbox, pokes and more.
 Charging via standard mini USB cable.  (Though  its own charging unit (wall plug) and USB to mini USB cable are included, any standard mini USB cable can be used to charge the skypephone in various locations or when traveling.)
 Brew games

Not supported functionality 
 Only Western Eu Latin Alphabets are supported, Cyrillic as used in Russian/Bulgarian and probably many other languages is not supported with all skype, web browser and text messages (SMS).

3 Skypephone S2x
The 3 Skypephone S2x is an upgrade of the 3 Skypephone S2. It is a slightly different shape and design and has a slightly poorer camera.

See also
 3 Skypephone Series
 3 Skypephone S1
 Skype
 Hutchison 3G (3)
 BREW

References

External links

3 (company)
Skype
Amoi mobile phones